is a Japanese director, animator, and storyboard artist. He joined Shaft in 1995 as an episode director and storyboard artist, and although he continues to work for Shaft, Suzuki commonly directs series with other studios, most notably with Xebec, where he made his series directorial debut with Heroic Age in 2007.

Career and life
Suzuki joined Shaft around 1988 as a key animator. He made his debut as an episode director and storyboard artist for the studio's first original television series, Juuni Senshi Bakuretsu Eto Ranger, in 1995. His employment with Shaft continued until the early 2000s, when he decided to go freelance (he continued to work with Shaft as a freelancer). In 2007, he debuted as a series director with Xebec with Heroic Age under the supervision of Takashi Noto. For the next few years, Suzuki focused solely on freelancing work with other studios. He continued to do work with Xebec, directing Lagrange: The Flower of Rin-ne and Fafner in the Azure: Heaven and Earth, and started directing series outside of either Xebec or Shaft, such as The Pilot's Love Song and The Price of Smiles. However, he remains a prominent figure at Shaft and works on most of the studio's productions.

Suzuki was born in 1966, and he is married.

Style
He said that he is a fan of hard sci-fi, as well as a fan of foreign sci-fi productions, which he has used for inspiration on works like Fafner in the Azure and Heroic Age. Although a fan of watching realistic and 'muddy' depictions of emotions, he himself does not like to make realistic depictions in his works, and is instead more interested in making his works beautiful and exaggerated. Writer Tow Ubukata commented on Suzuki's ideal of beauty by saying he was good at directing emotional scenes.

After he worked as Akiyuki Shinbo's assistant on Tsukuyomi: Moon Phase, Suzuki wanted to use some of Shinbo's visual composition techniques himself while working on Fafner: Right of Left succeeding the end of Tsukuyomis production.

Works

Television series
 Highlights roles with series directorial duties. Highlights roles with assistant director or supervising duties.

OVAs
 Highlights roles with series directorial duties.

Films
 Highlights roles with series directorial duties.

Video games

Notes

References

External links

1966 births
Anime directors
Living people